Alpine Tunnel is a  narrow gauge railroad tunnel located east of Pitkin, Colorado on the former Denver, South Park and Pacific Railroad route from Denver to Gunnison. However, it did not last long in service. Construction began in January 1880 and was scheduled to last for six months but instead dragged on until July 1882, and the line was abandoned in 1910 due to minor damage in the tunnel. Now the tunnel is sealed shut and the remaining trackbed serves as a trail for hikers and bicyclists.

History
Location of the tunnel portals and establishing a center line of the bore were completed in December 1879. Construction took place from 1880–1881, by Cummings & Co. Construction company, and the tunnel was "holed through" on July 26, 1881. This was the highest and most expensive tunnel built up until that time. It is more than two miles (3 km) above sea level, with its highest point at 11,523.7 feet (3,512.4 m). It is 500 feet (150 m) under Altman Pass, later to be renamed Alpine Pass to prevent confusion, with a 1,825-foot (556 m) bore. It took 18 months to complete, with most of the construction done during the winter months.

The DSP & P had anticipated boring the Alpine tunnel through solid rock, taking about 6 months to complete.  In the event, the line of the tunnel was found to run primarily through loose rock and clay; this very unstable ground required substantial timbering.  The additional work necessitated by the unexpected ground conditions was a major contributor to the 18 month construction time.

The tunnel was abandoned in 1910 by the Colorado & Southern due to minor damage in the interior. This was not considered to be worth repairing due to a lack of traffic, as the line failed to get much beyond Gunnison on the west side. The Gunnison Division of the Colorado & Southern was abandoned from St. Elmo on the east side of the pass to Quartz on the west side. The line from Quartz to Baldwin was given to the Denver & Rio Grande Western in exchange for some little used lines around Leadville.

Present day
The east portal of the tunnel has collapsed and the west portal has been covered by landslides. The former railbed is now a hiking trail on the east side, and a rough road over the former railbed on the west side leads to a restored train station. The road to the west portal was damaged in 2016 and was reopened on August 1st 2022 until August 31st 2022.

Little remains of the station complex built by the railroad to service its trains and workers at this remote and inhospitable location.  Volunteers have restored the railroad's 1883 Alpine Tunnel telegraph office and reconstructed the station platform,  of rail track, a turntable and an outhouse.  Only ruins remain of the section house and engine house, and other buildings and railroad infrastructure have disappeared. Volunteers work on restoration of the complex at least once a year.

The Alpine Tunnel Historic District was placed on the National Register of Historic Places in April 1996.  It is typically open from July to September.

Gallery

See also
National Register of Historic Places listings in Gunnison County, Colorado
 Railroad tunnel
 Rail trail
 Narrow gauge railroads in the United States
 Historic preservation

External links

 Western Portal of the Alpine Tunnel - Pitkin Area
 Guide to the Alpine Tunnel Historical District
 Denver Post hiking guide to Alpine Tunnel
  The Alpine Tunnel Historic District
 A detailed history
 An introduction and short history of the DSP&P's Alpine Tunnel
 PALISADE ON ALPINE TUNNEL ROAD DAMAGED BY AVALANCHE

Transportation buildings and structures in Chaffee County, Colorado
Railroad tunnels in Colorado
Rail trails in Colorado
Transportation buildings and structures in Gunnison County, Colorado
National Register of Historic Places in Gunnison County, Colorado
Rail mountain passes of the United States
Denver, South Park and Pacific Railroad
Tunnels completed in 1882
Mountain passes of Colorado
Railway tunnels on the National Register of Historic Places
Railway buildings and structures on the National Register of Historic Places in Colorado